Before the Beach is a compilation album by American popular music singer-songwriter Jimmy Buffett.  It includes the entire original releases of his first two albums, Down to Earth and High Cumberland Jubilee except for "The Christian?" and "Ain't He a Genius" (from Down to Earth) but with the addition of "High Cumberland Dilemma" which was recorded for but not included on the original High Cumberland Jubilee album.  Before the Beach was released in May 1993 on MCA 10823 and was the first compact disc of material from Down to Earth and High Cumberland Jubilee.  It is the only collection of those albums' material to appear on the music charts, reaching No. 169 on the Billboard 200 in 1993.

Track listing

Personnel

Jimmy Buffett – vocals, guitar, kazoo
Lanny Fiel – guitar, piano
Bob Cook – guitar, harmonica, bass
Bobby Thompson – banjo
Bergen White – trombone
Buzz Cason – keyboards, background vocals
Randy Goodrum – keyboards
Rick Fiel – bass
Dave Haney – bass
Travis Turk – drums, kazoo
Karl Himmel – drums
Paul Tabet – drums
Don Kloetzke – background vocals

Track information and credits adapted the album's liner notes.

See also 
 Down to Earth
 High Cumberland Jubilee
 Down to Earth and High Cumberland Jubilee compilations

References

External links 
 Before the Beach at BuffettRemasters.com

1993 compilation albums
Jimmy Buffett compilation albums
MCA Records compilation albums